Ulises Zurita Jiménez (born 29 March 1997) is a Mexican professional footballer who plays as a centre-back.

Honours
Morelia
Liga de Expansión MX: Clausura 2022

Notes

References

External links 
 
 

Mexican footballers
Mexican expatriate footballers
1997 births
Living people
Ascenso MX players
Tercera División players
C.D. Guadalajara footballers
Atlético Morelia players
Atlético San Luis footballers
Venados F.C. players
Association football defenders
Footballers from Guadalajara, Jalisco
Mexican expatriate sportspeople in Spain
Expatriate footballers in Spain